Passage Island is one of Falkland Islands, in Byron Sound, to the north of West Falkland. It is not to be confused with the Passage Islands which are to the west of West Falkland. It is to the west of Golding Island.

References

Islands of the Falkland Islands